Denise Brunkus is an American illustrator of children's picture books. She has illustrated more than 60 books, including the Junie Beatrice Jones series and Read All About It! by Laura and Jenna Bush.

Early works 

 The Case of the Wandering Weathervanes: a McGurk mystery, written by E.W. Hildick (Macmillan US, 1988)
 The Principal's New Clothes, Stephanie Calmenson (Scholastic Press, 1989) — adapted from Andersen's 1837 classic, "The Emperor's New Clothes"
 Oliva Sharp series, written by Marjorie W. Sharmat and Mitchell Sharmat, published by Delacorte Press
 The Pizza Monster (1989)
 The Princess of the Fillmore Street School (1989)
 The Sly Spy (1990)
 The Green Toenails Gang (1991)
 Show and Tell, Elvira Woodruff (Holiday House, 1991)

References

External links 
 
 Junie B. Jones at publisher Random House
 "Drawing Junie B. Jones", interview at Colorado Parent (November 2012)
 The Making of Read All About It! at publisher HarperCollins

American children's book illustrators
Living people
Year of birth missing (living people)
Place of birth missing (living people)
American women illustrators
20th-century American artists
20th-century American women artists
21st-century American women